Captain Richard Lippincott, U.E. (January 2, 1745 – May 14, 1826) was a United Empire Loyalist who served in the British Army during the American Revolutionary War. He is best known for his part in the Asgill Affair, in which he hanged a enemy officer, Joshua Huddy, in revenge for similar murders of Loyalists, provoking an international incident.

Lippincott was born in Shrewsbury, New Jersey, a member of an old colonial family. He married on March 4, 1770, Esther Borden, daughter of Jeremiah and Esther Borden, of Bordentown, New Jersey. On the outbreak of the American Revolutionary War, he sided with the Crown. Captured early in the war and confined in the jail at Burlington, New Jersey, he escaped in 1776 and made his way to the British Army at Staten Island. He fought with the New Jersey Volunteers, which David Gagan described as an irregular group that fought guerilla warfare behind American lines.

In 1782, Lippincott's brother-in-law, Philip White, was seized from his home by Americans, who made him run a gauntlet. When his body was found, he appeared to have been subjected to further torture and his body mutilated: his legs had been broken, one of his eyes had been gouged out, and one of his arms was missing. 

Subsequently, Loyalist soldiers under Lippincott's command hanged a captured rebel captain, Joshua Huddy, and pinned a note to his body that stated that the hanging was in retaliation for White's death. Patriot Commander-in-Chief George Washington demanded his British opposite Sir Henry Clinton court-martial Lippincott.  Lippincott's defence successfully argued that as an irregular, he was technically a civilian, subject to civilian, not military, law. Chief Justice William Smith ruled that he did not have jurisdiction to try Lippincott since the incident occurred in an area outside effective British control.

Lippincott was not convicted, but according to Gagan, "Clinton was forced to hold Lippincott in custody for the duration of the war to prevent Washington from exacting his revenge on an officer in Lord Cornwallis' captive army." After conferring with his officers, Washington determined a course of retaliation was called for. On his orders, British Captain Charles Asgill, who had been taken prisoner at the surrender at Yorktown, was selected by lot to be killed in retaliation for the death of Huddy. Washington relented and spared Asgill only after pressure was applied on the Americans by the French government.

At the Evacuation of New York at the end of the war, Lippincott removed first to Nova Scotia and later to Upper Canada. In 1806 he went to live with his newly married daughter, Esther, and his son-in-law George Taylor Denison in York (now Toronto). Lippincott Street, in Toronto's Harbord Village, is named after him. He is buried in Weston, Ontario.

Sources

References

External links

This book incorporates text taken directly from The Loyalists of America and Their Times: from 1620 to 1816, a text in public domain.
 

1745 births
1826 deaths
Loyalists in the American Revolution from New Jersey
People from Monmouth County, New Jersey
Loyalist military personnel of the American Revolutionary War